Notobor Notout is a Bengali comedy drama film directed by Amit Sengupta and screenplayed by Kamaleshwar Mukherjee. This film was released on 12 November 2010.

Plot
Notobor, a typical Bengali youngman wants to be a poet. Without getting appreciation he becomes frustrated. One night he dreams Rabindranath Tagore. The great poet grants a wish of Notobor and turns him a talented poet for a limited period. Now by this poetic power he tries to impress Mistu, his crush.

Cast
 Prokash Golam Mustafa as Notobor
 Raima Sen as Mistu
 Kharaj Mukherjee as Balai
 Mir Afsar Ali as Painter
 Moon Moon Sen
 Kaushik Ganguly
 Saayoni Ghosh
 Biswajit Chakraborty as Corbett
 Sudipa Basu as Sutapa
 Ramaprasad Banik as Brajeswar
 Chandan Sen
 Saswata Chatterjee
 Kamalika Banerjee as Manjula
 Mousumi Saha

References

External links
 

2010 films
Bengali-language Indian films
2010 comedy-drama films
Indian comedy-drama films
2010s Bengali-language films